The Catchwater Drain or Duckpool Catchwater is an artificial watercourse in Lincolnshire draining into the River Witham near to Stixwould. It begins as Minting Beck, a stream originating in Great Sturton approximately five miles north of Horncastle, which becomes known as Great Drain between Gautby and Bucknall. Tributaries include Wispington Beck, All Hallows Drain, Monk's Drain/Poolham Beck and Reeds Beck.

References

Rivers of Lincolnshire